Šenkvice is a village and municipality in central Slovakia in  Pezinok District in the Bratislava region. The town of roughly 5,000 people lies east of Pezinok and south of Modra, and is connected to each via a main road.  Another road connects Šenkvice to Blatné, which lies about five kilometers (three miles) south-east.

Name and etymology
The name derives from a Slavic personal name Čaník (1256, villa Chanuk). The German colonists adopted the Slovak name (probably Čaníkovce) as Sankawych, Sankavich (1390) and finally as Schenkowitz, Schenkwitz. In the 16th century, the village was abandoned and resettled by the Croatians who adopted the German name and changed it to Šenkvice.  This became also the Slovak name.

History
Early settlements from the Neolithic and Bronze Age were found in the town, as well as signs of human activity during Ancient Roman times.

The first written record of the village can be found in a letter by the Hungarian king Béla IV from 1256.  The town was burned down during the Mongol invasion. Soon, the area was resettled by German settlers. In 1547 the village has experienced an influx of Croatians, who were fleeing from the advancing Ottoman Empire. More Croatians from the town of Hrvatska Kostajnica came in 1594 and founded a small settlement nearby, originally called Small Šenkvice. Later, it merged into Šenkvice. In 1682, the town has built fortifications around the Church of Saint Anne, where the inhabitants hid during Ottoman incursions.

During the Middle Ages, the village built its first church, roughly in 1350 in Gothic style. The church has burned down and was replaced by a new one in the second half of the 16th century.  This church was later expanded and in 1666 rebuilt in Renaissance style with some Baroque elements. The church has retained this look till today.

After the Ottomans were driven off, the town began stagnating. Not even the opening of a railroad line connecting Šenkvice with Pezinok in 1845 has revived the village, and only after the founding of Czechoslovakia in 1918 the town started experiencing growth, thanks to an influx of new companies.

Economy and infrastructure
Šenkvice is best known for its wine production.  The largest winemaker in the town is Karpatská Perla, which has received several awards for its wines. In addition, the town has a bakery, Framipek, which supplies stores in from Senec to Pezinok, and a plastic sheeting manufacturer, Novplasta.

The village is fully gasified, and it has water and sewage systems. There is a train station, as well as several bus links to the surrounding cities. Šenkvice has a kindergarten and grade school, a fire station, health center, library and town museum.

Culture and entertainment
The town features a young folk group, Mladosť. It also has a town museum, currently consisting of one room near the Culture House. The Culture House features theatre and musical shows, including performances by the town's volunteer theater group, which celebrated its 100th birthday in 2006.

Šenkvice has a soccer team, which plays in the Slovak league's next-to-lowest fourth division. The town also has a gymnastic team and a field hockey team as well. However, it is most famous for its indoors motocross track.

Demographics
As of December 31, 2004, the town had 4327 inhabitants: 2131 male and 2196 female. 98.2% of them were of Slovak ethnicity; the largest minority was Czech. 86.9% were Roman Catholics, 2.2% Lutherans and 8.8% atheists. Of the 1199 houses in the village, 1056 were permanently occupied.

Famous people 
 Jozef Figura (*1906 –  † 2001), SDB,  Roman Catholic priest end Missionary (Japan).
 Anton Figura (*1909 –  † 1996), SDB,  Roman Catholic priest end Missionary (Cuba, Haiti, Dominican Republic).

Notes

External links 

 Official home page (in Slovak)

Croatian communities in Slovakia
Villages and municipalities in Pezinok District